Harald zur Hausen NAS EASA APS (born 11 March 1936) is a German virologist and professor emeritus. He has done research on cervical cancer and discovered the role of papilloma viruses in cervical cancer, for which he received the Nobel Prize in Physiology or Medicine 2008.

Early life and education
Zur Hausen was born in Gelsenkirchen in a Catholic family. He completed his Abitur at Gymnasium Antonianum in Vechta, then studied medicine at the Universities of Bonn, Hamburg and Düsseldorf, and received a Doctor of Medicine degree in 1960 from the University of Düsseldorf, after which he became a medical assistant.

Career

Two years after qualifying as a medical doctor, he joined the Institute for Microbiology at the University of Düsseldorf as a laboratory assistant. After three and a half years there, he moved to Philadelphia to work at the Virus Laboratories of Children's Hospital of Philadelphia together with eminent virologists Werner and Gertrude Henle,  who had escaped from Nazi Germany. In 1967, he contributed to a ground-breaking study that for the first time proved a virus (Epstein–Barr virus) can turn healthy cells (lymphocytes) into cancer cells. He became an assistant professor at the University of Pennsylvania. In 1969, he returned to Germany to become a regular teaching and researching professor at the University of Würzburg's Institute for Virology. In 1972, he moved to the University of Erlangen–Nuremberg.  In 1977, he moved on to the University of Freiburg (Breisgau), where he headed the Department of Virology and Hygiene.

Working with Lutz Gissmann, zur Hausen first isolated human papillomavirus 6 by simple centrifugation from genital warts. He isolated HPV 6 DNA from genital warts, suggesting a possible new way of identifying viruses in human tumors. This discovery paid off several years later, in 1983, when zur Hausen identified HPV 16 DNA in cervical cancer tumors by means of Southern blot hybridization.  This was followed by the discovery of HPV18 a year later,  thus identifying the causes of approximately 75% of human cervical cancer. The announcement of his breakthrough sparked a major scientific controversy, with other scientists favoring herpes simplex as a cause for cervical cancer.

From 1983 until 2003, zur Hausen served as chairman and scientific advisory board member of the German Cancer Research Center (Deutsches Krebsforschungszentrum, DKFZ in German) in Heidelberg and as professor of medicine at Heidelberg University.

From 2007 to 2011, zur Hausen was a member of the scientific advisory board of Zukunftskolleg at the University of Konstanz.

He was editor-in-chief of the International Journal of Cancer until the end of 2010. 

On 1 January 2010, zur Hausen became the president of German Cancer Aid, the largest cancer charity in Europe.

Scientific merits
Zur Hausen's field of research is the study of oncoviruses. In 1976, he hypothesized that human papillomavirus plays an important role in causing cervical cancer. Together with his collaborators, he then identified HPV16 and HPV18 in cervical cancers in 1983–84.  This research made possible the development of the HPV vaccine, the first formulation of which was commercialized in 2006.  He is also credited with discovery of the virus causing genital warts (HPV 6) and a monkey lymphotropic polyomavirus that is a close relative to a recently discovered human Merkel cell polyomavirus, as well as of techniques to immortalize cells with Epstein-Barr virus and to induce replication of the virus using phorbol esters.  His work on papillomaviruses and cervical cancer received a great deal of scientific criticism when first published  but subsequently was confirmed  and was used as the basis for research on other high-risk papillomaviruses.

Books

Prizes and Awards
Zur Hausen received the Gairdner Foundation International Award in 2008 for his contributions to medical science.

Nobel Prize 
Zur Hausen shared the 2008 Nobel Prize in Medicine with Luc Montagnier and Françoise Barré-Sinoussi, the discoverers of the human immunodeficiency virus (HIV).

The award of the 2008 Nobel Prize to Zur Hausen became controversial following the revelation that Bo Angelin, a member of the Nobel Assembly that year, also sat on the board of AstraZeneca, a company that earns patent royalties for HPV vaccines. The controversy was exacerbated by the fact that AstraZeneca had also entered into a partnership with Nobel Web and Nobel Media to sponsor documentaries and lectures to increase awareness of the prize. However, colleagues widely felt that the award was deserved, and the secretary of the Nobel Committee and Assembly issued a statement affirming that Bo Angelin was unaware of AstraZeneca's HPV vaccine patents at the time of the vote.

Awards and distinctions 
 Robert Koch Prize (1975)
 Lila and Murray Gruber Memorial Cancer Research Award from the American Academy of Dermatology (1985)
 Charles S. Mott Prize (1986)
 Beijerinck Virology Prize (1992)
 Paul Ehrlich and Ludwig Darmstaedter Prize (1994)
 International member of the American Philosophical Society (1998)
 Virchow Medal from the University of Würzburg (2000)
 San Marino Prize for Medicine (2002)
 Great Cross of Merit (2004)
 German Cancer Aid Award (2006)
 Raymond Bourgine Award (2006)
 William B. Coley Award for Distinguished Research in Basic and Tumor Immunology (with Ian Frazer) (2006)
 Loeffler-Frosch Medal (2007)
 Johann-Georg-Zimmermann Medal (2007)
 Warren Alpert Foundation Prize (2007)
 AACR Award for Lifetime Achievement in Cancer Research (2008)
 Gairdner Foundation International Award (2008)
 Nobel Prize in Physiology or Medicine (2008)
 Tsungming-Tu Prize (2011)
 Ernst Wertheim Prize (2012)
 Genome Valley Excellence Award from BioAsia 2014 (2014)
 Science of Oncology Award from the American Society of Clinical Oncology (2014)
 Mike Price Gold Medal Award from The European Association for Cancer Research (2014)

Memberships 
 Member of the Academia Europaea (1990)
 Member of the American Philosophical Society (1998)
 Honorary Member European Academy of Sciences and Arts (2008)
 International member of the National Academy of Sciences (2009)
 Foreign Member Finnish Society for Science (2010)
 Honorary Fellow of the World Hellenic Biomedical Association (2013)
 Fellow of the American Association for Cancer Research (2013)
 Honorary Member of the German Society of Virology (2013)
 Corresponding member of the Slovenian Academy of Sciences and Arts (June 2015)
 Fellow of the American Association for the Advancement of Science (2017)
 Honorary degrees from the universities of Chicago, Umeå, Prague, Salford, Helsinki, Erlangen-Nuremberg, Ferrara, Guadalajara and Sal

Personal life
Zur Hausen has three sons from his first marriage. In 1993, he married Ethel-Michele de Villiers, who at the time was a fellow researcher at the German Cancer Research Center, and who in prior years had co-authored many research journal articles with zur Hausen on papilloma virus and genital cancer, dating as far back as 1981. He acknowledged her research contributions and support in his Nobel Prize biography.

References

External links

 Zur Hausen Nobel Prize lecture
 Hausen: CV, Interviews, Publications
 

1936 births
Members of the European Molecular Biology Organization
Living people
People from Gelsenkirchen
Cancer researchers
German virologists
German medical researchers
German Nobel laureates
People from the Province of Westphalia
Nobel laureates in Physiology or Medicine
Papillomavirus
University of Bonn alumni
University of Hamburg alumni
Heinrich Heine University Düsseldorf alumni
Knights Commander of the Order of Merit of the Federal Republic of Germany
Recipients of the Order of Merit of Baden-Württemberg
University of Pennsylvania faculty
Academic staff of the University of Würzburg
Academic staff of the University of Erlangen-Nuremberg
Academic staff of the University of Freiburg
Academic staff of Heidelberg University
Members of the Slovenian Academy of Sciences and Arts
Infectious causes of cancer
Members of the German Academy of Sciences at Berlin
Foreign associates of the National Academy of Sciences
Members of the American Philosophical Society
Members of the National Academy of Medicine